Francis George Fowler (1871–1918), familiarly known as F. G. Fowler and sometimes Frank Fowler, was an English writer on English language, grammar and usage.
 
Born in Tunbridge Wells, F. G. Fowler was educated at Peterhouse, Cambridge. He lived on Guernsey in the Channel Islands.  He and his older brother, Henry Watson Fowler, wrote The King's English together, an influential book published in 1906. Later they worked on what became Fowler's Modern English Usage, but before it was finished, Francis died of tuberculosis, picked up during his service with the British Expeditionary Force in World War I.  He was 47 years old.

Henry dedicated Modern English Usage to Francis, writing, "he had a nimbler wit, a better sense of proportion, and a more open mind, than his twelve-year-older partner."

References

External links 
 
 

1871 births
1918 deaths
20th-century deaths from tuberculosis
English non-fiction writers
Guernsey writers
Alumni of Peterhouse, Cambridge
English male non-fiction writers
British Army personnel of World War I
Tuberculosis deaths in England